Al-Ittihad Club is an Omani sports club based in Salalah, Oman. The club is currently playing in Oman First Division League, first division of Oman Football Association. Their home ground is Al-Saada Stadium, but they also recognize the older Salalah Sports Complex as their home ground. Both stadiums are government owned, but they also own their own personal stadium and sports equipment, as well as their own training facilities.

Being a multisport club
Although being mainly known for their football, Al-Ittihad Club like many other clubs in Oman, have not only football in their list, but also hockey, volleyball, handball, basketball, badminton and squash. They also have various youth football teams competing in Oman Olympic League, Oman Youth League (U-19) and Oman Youth League (U-17).

Crest and colours
Al-Ittihad have been known since establishment to wear a full green or white (Away) kit (usually a darker shade of green), varying themselves from neighbors Al-Nasr S.C.S.C. (Blue), Dhofar S.C.S.C. (Red) and Salalah SC (Blue) kits. They have also had many different sponsors over the years. As of now, Nike provides them with kits.

Current squad

Honours and achievements

National titles
Omani League (0): 
Runners-up 1985-86
Oman First Division League (1): 
Winners 2012-13
Sultan Qaboos Cup (0): 
Runners-up 2011

Club performance-International Competitions

UAFA competitions
GCC Champions League: 1 appearance
2012–13 : Quarter-Finals

References

External links
Al-Ittihad Club - SOCCERWAY
Al-Ittihad Club - GOALZZ.com
Al-Ittihad Club - KOOORA
Al-Ittihad Club - ofa.om

Football clubs in Oman
Oman Professional League
Salalah
Association football clubs established in 1965
1965 establishments in Oman